The CPL–U Sports Draft is an annual event in which Canadian Premier League clubs select players from U Sports, Canada's governing body for university sports. The draft allows student-athletes to play professional soccer that year without affecting their university eligibility.

Developmental contract

Drafted players will get an invitation to the team's preseason camp, with the opportunity to earn a developmental contract. The developmental contract allows players to be paid to play in the CPL in the spring and summer, before returning to their university team before August 15 for the U Sports men's soccer season.

Signed players can remain with their CPL club until the end of the season in early November by extending their developmental contract. These players would be ineligible to participate in U Sports the same season as their contract but would regain eligibility the following year.

Rules and procedure

Players are eligible to be drafted if they have one or more years of U Sports eligibility remaining and have declared for the draft. Players who signed development contracts the previous year can be retained by their CPL clubs as long as they have U Sports eligibility remaining. Previously drafted players who do not sign and remain draft-eligible can re-enter the draft in subsequent years.

The previous season's league standings, including playoffs and final standings, determine the draft order. The draft previously employed a "snake draft" format with the selection order reversing after each round, however this was discontinued after the 2021 draft. Clubs have a window of time in which they must submit their pick, and failure to do so results in a pass. There is a break between each round, as well as one timeout per club.

List of drafts

References

 
U Sports soccer
Association football drafts
Annual sporting events in Canada
Recurring sporting events established in 2018
2018 establishments in Canada